María Brito (born María Cristina Brito in 1947 in Havana, Cuba) is a Cuban-American artist specializing in painting, sculpture and installations.

Early life and education
Brito entered the United States by way of the mass exodus Operation Peter Pan, with her parents following in 1962.  Brito received her Bachelor of Fine Arts from Florida International University (FIU) in 1978, and in 1979 obtained her Master of Fine Arts from the University of Miami in Coral Gables, Florida.

Individual exhibitions
 1980 – The Gallery at 24, Miami, Florida, E.E.U.U.
 1985 – "María Brito Avellana, George Dombek, Larry Rhoads", Florida Center for Contemporary Art, Tampa, Florida.
 1989 – "María Brito Avellana: Recent Sculpture"´´, Interamerican Art Gallery, Miami, Florida.
 1989 – Museum of Contemporary Hispanic Art (MoCHA), New York City.
 1991 – "María Brito: A Retrospective", Barry University Gallery, Miami Shores, Florida.
 1991 – "María Brito: A Retrospective"  Anne Jaffe Art Gallery, Bay Harbour, Florida.

Awards
 1977 – Excellence in Art – Florida International University, Miami, Florida, U.S.A.;
 1980 – Merit Award – Grove House, Coconut Grove, Miami, Florida, U.S.A.;
 1988 – Individual Artists Fellowship Award – Florida Department of State, Florida, U.S.A.;
 1988 – Pollock-Krasner Foundation Grant, U.S.A.

Collections
Her work can be found in several permanent collections:
 Archer M. Huntington Art Gallery, University of Texas at Austin, Austin, Texas
 Blanton Museum of Art
 Cintas Collection Inc, New York City
 Miami-Dade College, Kendall Campus, Miami, Florida
 Olympic Sculpture Park, Seoul, Korea
 Smithsonian American Art Museum, Washington, D.C.
 Miami-Dade Public Library System, Miami, Florida

References

  Jose Veigas-Zamora, Cristina Vives Gutierrez, Adolfo V. Nodal, Valia Garzon, Dannys Montes de Oca; Memoria: Cuban Art of the 20th Century; (California/International Arts Foundation 2001); 
 Jose Viegas; Memoria: Artes Visuales Cubanas Del Siglo Xx; (California International Arts 2004);   
 Juan A. Martinez, María Brito; (University of Minnesota Press, 2008);

External links
 UCLA webpage on artist
 University of Minnesota Press article on book on Maria Brito

1947 births
Living people
20th-century Cuban women artists
21st-century Cuban women artists
Cuban contemporary artists
People from Havana
Florida International University alumni
University of Miami alumni
Modern painters
Cuban women painters